Mut@ge.Mix@ge is an album by Front 242, released in 1995, a collection of both previously released and new material, some remixed by notable Electronica bands of the genre.

Critical reception

Vox magazine gave Mut@ge.Mix@ge a positive review, referring to the release as a "sabbatical stopgap' that "[errs] on the side of quiet ambience while managing to convey the menace of the Front's campaign." CMJ observes that "new school meets old school and the groove wins out" with this release and that "electronic music aficionados should find this album a tasty brew."

Track listing

(Tracks 2, 5, 8 previously unreleased)

Personnel
 Daniel Bressanutti
 Patrick Codenys
 Jean-Luc De Meyer
 Richard Jonckheere

References

Front 242 albums
1995 remix albums